

See also 
 Lists of fossiliferous stratigraphic units in Europe

References 
 

 Czech Republic
Geology of the Czech Republic
Fossiliferous stratigraphic units